Benzie Central Schools, also known as Benzie County Central School District, is a public school district in Benzie and Manistee Counties in the U.S. state of Michigan.

History 
In the fall of 1962, the school systems of Benzonia–Beulah, Honor, and Copemish were consolidated into the current school district. Classes were held in the old Benzonia High School until 1964, the year that the current junior-senior high school building in Benzonia Township was opened.

Schools

High school (9-12) 

 Benzie Central High School

Middle school (6-8) 

 Benzie Central Middle School

Elementary schools (PreK–5) 

A new elementary school, Homestead Hills Elementary School, is scheduled to open in fall of 2023. It will replace Crystal Lake Elementary School.

Former elementary school 

 Platte River Elementary School (closed 2018; served Honor)

References

External links 

 

Education in Benzie County, Michigan
Education in Manistee County, Michigan
School districts in Michigan
School districts established in 1962
1962 establishments in Michigan